This article is a list of seasons of the Dallas Cowboys American football franchise of the National Football League (NFL). The Cowboys franchise was founded in 1960 as an expansion team. The team has earned 33 postseason appearances, most in the NFL, the longest consecutive streak of winning seasons with twenty, the second-most appearances in the NFC Championship Game (fourteen, behind the San Francisco 49ers' fifteen) and the second-most  Super Bowl appearances (tied at eight with the Denver Broncos and Steelers) behind the New England Patriots with eleven. The Cowboys have played titles for ten NFL Championships and have won half of them, all five being Super Bowls.

The Cowboys won Super Bowls VI, XII, XXVII, XXVIII and XXX. They also played in and lost Super Bowls V, X, and XIII. Since winning Super Bowl XXX in the 1995 season, however, the Cowboys have twelve playoff appearances but only five playoff game victories and have not returned to the NFC Championship Game.

Seasons

Footnotes

References

 
 
 
 
 
 
 
 
 
 
 

Dallas Cowboys
 
seasons